The 2018 Aztorin Slovenian FIM Speedway Grand Prix was the eighth race of the 2018 Speedway Grand Prix season. It took place on September 7 at the Matija Gubec Stadium in Krško, Slovenia.

Riders 
First reserve Niels-Kristian Iversen replaced the injured Matej Žagar. The Speedway Grand Prix Commission also nominated Matic Ivačič as the wild card, and Nick Škorja and Denis Štojs both as Track Reserves.

Results 
The Grand Prix was won by Patryk Dudek, who beat defending world champion Jason Doyle, Greg Hancock and Fredrik Lindgren in the final. It was the second Grand Prix win of Dudek's career. Overall leader Tai Woffinden finished 14th, scoring just five points, while his nearest challenger Bartosz Zmarzlik scored 12 points on the way to reaching the semi-finals. As a result, Zmarzlik closed the gap at the top of the world championship standings to just nine points.

Heat details

Intermediate classification

References 

2018
Krško
Slovenia
Sports competitions in Slovenia
2018 in Slovenian sport